Sicyases is a genus of clingfishes native to the coasts of the southeastern Pacific Ocean.

Species
There are currently two recognized species in this genus:
 Sicyases brevirostris (Guichenot, 1848)
 Sicyases sanguineus J. P. Müller & Troschel, 1843

References

 
Gobiesocidae